David Wildasin is an American economist, currently the William T. Bryan Endowed Professor in Public Finance Emeritus at Martin School, University of Kentucky, and also a published author.

Education
Ph.D., University of Iowa 1976 Dissertation title: “Theoretical Issues in Local Public Finance” (Thomas Pogue, principal adviser)
B.A., University of Virginia 1972

References

External links
David Wildasin, 2020 Holland Medal Recipient

Living people
21st-century American economists
University of Kentucky faculty
American business writers
Year of birth missing (living people)
University of Iowa alumni
University of Virginia alumni